The 1938–39 Illinois Fighting Illini men's ice hockey season was the 2nd season of play for the program.

Season
The Illini were able to play their first full season in 1939 and showed improvement in their play. The team faced a tough slate of games, being dominated by some of college hockey's best teams but the program was able to earn its first three wins. Dick Fee was team captain until his graduation in February. Afterwards, Jim Beaumont led the Illini.

Roster

Standings

Schedule and results

|-
!colspan=12 style=";" | Regular Season

† Illinois archives list the score as 0–8, however, contemporary reports have the game as 0–4.‡ Notre Dame's and Saint Louis' programs were club teams at the time.

References

Illinois Fighting Illini men's ice hockey seasons
Illinois
Illinois
Illinois
Illinois